Semenka is a rural locality (a village) in Argunovskoye Rural Settlement, Nikolsky District, Vologda Oblast, Russia. The population was 57 as of 2002. There are 3 streets.

Geography 
Semenka is located 48 km northwest of Nikolsk (the district's administrative centre) by road. Argunovo is the nearest rural locality.

References 

Rural localities in Nikolsky District, Vologda Oblast